The 2000 Individual Long Track/Grasstrack World Championship was the 30th edition of the FIM speedway Individual Long Track World Championship.

The world title was won by Kelvin Tatum of England.

Venues

Final Classification

References 

2000
Motorsport in England
Speedway competitions in France
Speedway competitions in Germany
Speedway competitions in the Netherlands
Sports competitions in England
Long